Valienamine is a C-7 aminocyclitol found as a substructure of pseudooligosaccharides such as the antidiabetic drug acarbose and the antibiotic validamycin. It can be found in Actinoplanes species.

It is an intermediate formed by microbial degradation of validamycins.

References

External links 
 Valienamine on chemblink.com

Cyclitols
Cyclohexenes
Amines